David Reeves may refer to:

Davy DMX (born 1960), American hip hop musician
David Wallis Reeves (1838–1900), American composer
David Reeves (composer) (born 1943), Australian composer and organist
David Reeves, president and CEO of Sony Computer Entertainment, 2005–2009
Dave Reeves (born 1967), English former footballer
David Leroy Reeves (1872–1949), American football player and coach